Nathaniel Smibert (January 20, 1734 – November 8, 1756), was an American colonial artist in Boston, Province of Massachusetts, active in the mid-18th century. He is considered to be the first portrait painter in America.

Biography
Born in Boston in 1734, Nathaniel Smibert trained as a painter with his father, artist John Smibert. He painted several portraits, notably of Ezra Stiles, architect Peter Harrison, and Dorothy Wendell (in the Collection of Dr John L Hale, Boston). Smibert died young in 1756, at the age of twenty-two.

Image gallery

References

Further reading
 

1734 births
1756 deaths
18th-century American painters
18th-century American male artists
American male painters
Artists from Boston
18th century in Boston
Painters from Massachusetts